Türkiye Halk Bankası A.Ş. v. United States (Docket 21-1450) is a pending United States Supreme Court case concerning the exposure of Turkish state-owned bank Halkbank to prosecution by the Department of Justice under the Foreign Sovereign Immunities Act of 1976, and more broadly, the limits imposed by the sovereign immunity doctrine on criminal prosecution.

Background 
After a ruling by the United States Court of Appeals for the Second Circuit, the Supreme Court granted certiorari, asking "[w]hether U.S. district courts may exercise subject-matter jurisdiction over criminal prosecutions against foreign sovereigns and their instrumentalities under 18 U.S.C.... and in light of the Foreign Sovereign Immunities Act".

The governments of Azerbaijan, Pakistan, and Turkey filed amicus briefs in support of Halkbank.

Argument 
Oral argument took place on January17, 2023. Lisa Blatt argued on behalf of Halkbank.

See also 
 2013 corruption scandal in Turkey
 United States v. Atilla

References

External links 
 

United States Supreme Court cases
United States Supreme Court cases of the Roberts Court
2023 in United States case law
Sanctions against Iran